Damien Menzo (born 18 October 1993 in Amsterdam) is a Dutch professional footballer who plays in the Tweede Divisie for ASV De Dijk. He plays as a winger.

His uncle is the former AFC Ajax and Netherlands national football team goalkeeper Stanley Menzo.

References

External links
 Voetbal International profile 
 

1993 births
Living people
Dutch footballers
FC Volendam players
Eerste Divisie players
Footballers from Amsterdam
Association football midfielders
ASV De Dijk players